Sovereigntism, sovereignism or souverainism (from , , meaning the ideology of sovereignty) is the notion of having control over one's conditions of existence, whether at the level of the self, social group, region, nation or globe.  Typically used for describing the acquiring or preserving political independence of a nation or a region, a sovereigntist aims to "take back control" from perceived powerful forces, either against internal subversive minority groups (ethnic, sexual or gender), or from external global governance institutions, federalism and supranational unions.  It generally leans instead toward isolationism, and can be associated with certain independence movements, but has also been used to justify violating the independence of other nations.

Classification
Sovereigntism has a cultural as well as political component and can take the form of hostility towards outsiders having different values or different countries or regions of origin.  Sovereigntist groups are associated with populism since they typically claim legitimacy for carrying out the sovereign will of the people.  While leftist sovereigntists tend to think of their national border as a defensive line against the corrosive effects of neo-liberal economics, right wing sovereigntists see it more as a filter protecting the sovereign people from undesired new members.

Though there are wide differences in ideology and historical context between sovereigntist movements, those of the twenty first century can be thought of as belonging to three separate categories: conservative sovereigntism, archeo-sovereigntism, and neo-sovereigntism.   Conservative sovereignism embraces the national Westphalian model of sovereignty seeking to preserve the interstate order with norms promoting global economic order but halting further advances towards political integration. Some vestiges of colonialism remain, with old powers retaining what they see as historical special responsibilities to intervene in former possessions, such as in the case of Russia's invasion of Ukraine. Amongst rising powers, neo-sovereigntism is concerned with issues of autonomism, especially against more privileged nations with concentrated power in transnational entities such as the UN security council or G7.  It seeks to strengthen norms and agreements protecting the independence of each state, granting their equality, and restraining more powerful states from attempts to influence the behavior of other nations.  Archeo-sovereigntism is the most radical, rejecting forces of globalization and restraints on states by transnational bodies, norms and agreements, calling for a return to a pre- World War II order when states were freer from such interference.  Examples in Europe include the Front National in France, the Lega Nord in Italy, the Dansk Folk Party in Denmark, and the UKIP in the UK.

In a paper published in the European Review of International Studies outlining these three major tendencies, researchers Alles and Badie summarised them thus:

Europe 
In Europe, sovereigntist political movements divide (on the one hand) between those that seek to leave the European Union completely (or oppose joining it) and (on the other), those who aim for a "Europe of the nations", a less integrated Europe respecting the individual characteristics and sovereignty of constituent states. Supporters of these doctrines tend to regard themselves as Euro-realists opposed to the Euro-federalists and call for a more confederal version of a European Union. (The European Union is not a federation but shares many characteristics of one.) Thus, sovereigntism in Europe is opposed to federalism and typically involves nationalism, particularly in the United Kingdom (which withdrew from the EU in 2020) and in France where parties on the left and right margins lean strongly towards it.

France 

The souverainiste doctrine is particularly influential in France, where numerous political movements adhere to it:
 French Action (monarchist, far-right reactionary)
 France Arise (Gaullist and republican)
 French Nationalist Party (neofascist, ethnic nationalism)
 La France Insoumise (left-wing)
 Mouvement for France (conservative)
 Citizen and Republican Movement (left-wing)
 National Rally (right-wing nationalist)
 Nouvelle Action Royaliste (monarchist)
 Democratic Rally (centrist and monarchist)
 Rally for France (Gaullist and republican)
 Popular Republican Union (Gaullist and republican)
 Pole of Communist Revival in France (Marxist–Leninist)

Germany 
Parties with tendencies that could be described also as sovereigntist can be also found in Germany:
 Alternative for Germany (right-wing, ethnic nationalist, conservative)
 National Democratic Party of Germany (far-right, ethnic nationalist, neofascist)

Greece 
Parties with tendencies that could be described also as sovereigntists can also be found in Greece:
 Syriza (left-wing, economic nationalism, democratic socialist)
 Independent Greeks (right-wing, ethnic nationalist, conservative)
 Communist Party of Greece (Marxist–Leninist)
 Golden Dawn (ethnic nationalist, neofascist)
 Popular Orthodox Rally (ethnic nationalist, religious conservatism)

Italy 
Parties with tendencies that could be described also as sovereigntist can be also found in Italy:
 League (right-wing populist, conservative, federalist)
 Brothers of Italy (right-wing populist, national conservative)
 Italexit (populist, conservative)
 CasaPound (neo-fascist, anti-capitalist)
 New Force (neo-fascist, Third positionist)
 Tricolour Flame (neo-fascist, third positionist)
 Communist Party (Marxist–Leninist)

Romania
Parties with tendencies that could be described also as sovereigntist can be also found in Romania:
 Alliance for the Union of Romanians (nationalist, traditionalist, conservative, right-wing populist)
 Romanian Nationhood Party (national conservative, Islamophobic)
 Alliance for the Homeland (economic patriotism, syncretic)
 Christian Democratic National Peasants' Party (Christian right, national conservative)

Russia 
Since 2006, Vladimir Putin has espoused the current Russian sovereigntist view of a political, economic, and cultural  battle between sovereign peoples of Russia on one side, and on the other- transnational institutions with their neoliberal and cosmopolitan ideologies undermining Russia’s sovereignty and cultural existence.  In Putinism, the "national wealth" of the multiethnic Russian peoples (its morality, values, memory of its forefathers and its culture) both defines and is protected by its sovereignty.    Putin advisor Vladislav Surkov articulated the threat to "sovereign democracy" posed by international organizations serving the interest of Nato, the OSCE, and the unipolar world order controlled by the United States.   According to the ideology of Putinism, Georgian and Ukrainian sovereignty could not be respected since it had already been lost due to their color revolutions, seens as a collapse of borders protecting them from being engulfed culturally, economically and politically by Europe and the West.  As a cultural and political protector against threatening Western powers, the idea of a sovereign union of multiple peoples under Russia’s leadership has been employed as a legitimation theory for imperial expansion.  This usage predates the Soviet Union, tracing back to Pan-slavism’s origins in the 16th century, later becoming integrated with Russian nationalism, imperialism and Orthodox messianism in the 19th century.

Serbia 
Parties with tendencies that could be described also as sovereigntist can be also found in Serbia:
 Enough is Enough (right-wing populist, eurosceptic)
 Serbian Radical Party (ultranationalist, eurosceptic)
 Dveri (national conservative, Christian democratic)
 Democratic Party of Serbia (national conservative, Christian democratic)

Spain  
Parties with tendencies that could be described also as sovereigntist can be also found in Spain:
 ADÑ–Spanish Identity (far-right, ethnic nationalist)
 Falange Española de las JONS (national syndicalist, third positionist)
 Vox (right-wing, national conservative)

Catalonia
In the Parliament of Catalonia, parties explicitly supporting independence from Spain are Together for Catalonia (JxCat) (which includes Partit Demòcrata Europeu Català (PDeCAT), heir of the former Convergència Democràtica de Catalunya (CDC)); Esquerra Republicana de Catalunya (ERC), and Candidatura d'Unitat Popular (CUP).

United Kingdom 

North America

Canada 
In the Canadian province of Quebec, souverainisme or sovereigntism refers to the Quebec sovereignty movement, which argues for Quebec to separate from Canada and become its own nation. Many leaders in the movement, notably René Lévesque, have preferred the terms "sovereignty" and "sovereigntist" over other common names such as separatist or independentist, although this terminology may be objected to by opponents.

Quebec 
 Parti Québécois (centre-left, nationalist and social democratic)
 Bloc Québécois (centre-left, nationalist and social democratic, represents Quebec separatism in Canada's federal parliament)
 Option nationale (centre-left, nationalist and progressive)
 Québec solidaire (left-wing, democratic socialist)

United States
Coupled with its history of isolationism and sense of American exceptionalism, US sovereigntism is largely a conservative perspective, celebrating both American self-definition and liberty to engage in unilateral action.   Sovereigntism in foreign policy is charactized by opposition to multilateral regimes relating to climate change, war crimes, arms control and international declaration of human rights.   

The dominant US sovereigntist perspective is currently that of Trumpism and has three dimensions:
 World order and peace is best secured by sovereign states looking after themselves, as opposed to rules based international order of interdependent and integrated countries.
 The needs of the American people come first before any other concern of government. Any other prioritization violates the sovereignty of the people.
 Sovereigntism is used partisan weapon, where anyone who differs with Trumpian formulations of sovereignty are identified as political enemies.

A more extreme conservative view of popular sovereignty involves a radical unwinding of centralized government and an expansion of regional sovereignty, where freedoms are controlled at the local level, not adjudicated at the federal level.  From the perspective of tea party and continuing among followers of Trumpism, the populist concept of the sovereign people refers exclusively to a specifically defined Christian community that “invites people of different backgrounds to unite under a common 'American' sense of self".  Similar to the perspective of Putinism, those individuals who maintain a separate minority identity are not only excluded, but are regarded as a threat to the majority’s sovereignty, especially when they seek legal redress for violation of their human rights as defined by constitutional and international norms.

See also

References

  

Sovereignty
Political terminology
Conservatism in France
Politics of Quebec
Political terminology in Canada